Natividad Zialcita (religious name: Mother Mary Cecilia of Jesus, O.C.D.) (7 September 1908 – 13 December 1982) was a Discalced Carmelite nun and prioress of the Carmelite monastery in Lipa during the alleged apparitions of the Blessed Virgin Mary under the title of Our Lady, Mediatrix of All Grace (1948). She was also the confidante of the visionary postulant, Teresita Castillo.

Establishment of the Carmel of Lipa
When the Carmel of Gilmore was founded in 1926, and Bishop Alfredo Versoza learned about it, he began appealing to the nuns to give him a Carmel in Lipa. After the Second World War, the Carmelites responded to the invitation. The place given them was the seminary, where a number of Lipeno people had been massacred, because it was the only property in the diocese available at that time. The Carmelite monastery was founded in 1946, and Zialcita was elected prioress.

Apparitions

Teresita Castillo, daughter of a former governor of Lipa, was born in Quiapo. By the time she entered the Carmel of Lipa, many mystical and unexplained occurrences had already begun. Zialcita eventually heard Castillo's reports that she was being visited by a devil and the apparition and requests of a beautiful lady in her cell. After a long observation of these events, she came to believe in the visions of Castillo. Castillo and Zialcita confided everything to their spiritual director, the auxiliary bishop Alfredo Maria Obviar. Zialcita also reportedly became a recipient of interior locutions from the Blessed Virgin Mary, who instructed her how to assist Castillo in fulfilling her requests.

The Verdict in 1951
The apparitions became later known in public through news about miraculous healings, heavy fragrance of roses, the shower of rose petals that bore images of Jesus, Mary and religious scenes, the appearance of the blue bird and the spinning sun like what happened in Fatima, Portugal. Initial recognition by the Bishop of Lipa was followed by a subsequent negative final decision. The verdict was signed by a commission composed of one archbishop and five bishops, namely: Gabriel Reyes of Manila, Bp.Cesar Maria Guerrero of San Fernando, Mariano Madriaga of Lingayen, Rufino Santos, the newly assigned Apostolic Administrator of Lipa, Vicente Reyes, Auxiliary Bishop of Manila and Juan Sison, Auxiliary Bishop of Nueva Segovia.

Expulsion
Zialcita was then banished from Lipa along with Sister Mary Anne, the sub-prioress of the Carmel of Lipa, after the negative verdict was issued by the Catholic Church authorities, and she was reduced to the status of as scullery maid.

Later life and death
In February 1982, the Jesuit Federico Escalar of Ipil gave them a retreat, during which she was released from the ban of silence that had been imposed to her as well as to other witnesses of the apparitions in 1948 by the Apostolic Nunciature Egidio Vagnozzi.

On 13 December 1982, Zialcita fell from the stairs of Carmel. She suffered a head injury and later died in the night.

References 

1908 births
1982 deaths
People from Quiapo, Manila
Carmelite spirituality
Discalced Carmelites
Filipino Servants of God
Venerated Carmelites
20th-century venerated Christians
20th-century Filipino Roman Catholic nuns